Zhang Weili (born August 13, 1989) is a Chinese mixed martial artist. She is the former Kunlun Fight (KLF) strawweight champion and competes in the strawweight division of the Ultimate Fighting Championship (UFC), where she is the current and two-time UFC Women's Strawweight Champion. She is the first ever Chinese champion in UFC history. As of March 7, 2023, she is ranked #4 in the UFC women's pound-for-pound rankings.

Background 
Zhang was born in Handan, Hebei, China. Her father is a retired miner, and her mother is a housewife. She has one older brother, who quit his job as a gold trader to support Zhang's career, and now works at the gym where she trains.

She started training in martial arts at a young age, beginning 
at 6 with Shaolin Kung Fu under the tutelage of a local master, after she was inspired by Kung Fu films. In primary school, she practiced many sports including athletics, football and table tennis. When she was 12, her parents sent her to a specialized martial arts school in Handan where she began training in Sanda and a Chinese style of wrestling called Shuai jiao. After winning Sanda championships of the Hebei province multiple times, she was selected for the Jiangsu province Sanda team, however a recurring back injury sustained in training forced her to quit the sport early.

At the age of 17 she moved to Beijing, where she worked various odd jobs: cashier at a supermarket, kindergarten teacher, security guard and hotel desk clerk. In 2010 she found a job at a local Beijing gym as a fitness instructor, and was allowed to use their equipment for free after the gym closed in the evenings. During that time she would also pick up Brazilian jiu-jitsu, after watching others grappling there. She later switched to a front desk job, through which she got to know fighters who trained at the gym, one of them being her idol Wu Haotian, a pioneer of Chinese MMA.  After they became acquainted in 2012, Haotian brought her to Black Tiger Fight Club. There, she was noticed by coach Cai Xuejun, who recognized her potential and started training her in MMA.

In a Chinese television show in December 2019, she mentioned that Hong Kong Action Superstar Donnie Yen was her inspiration to compete in MMA, and that Donnie Yen's 2007 feature film Flashpoint was her first introduction to the sport of MMA. She also credited Ronda Rousey, and particularly her fight with Liz Carmouche in 2013, as giving her the motivation to quit her job and pursue MMA full-time.

Mixed martial arts career

Early career 
Zhang made her professional MMA debut in 2013. After losing her professional debut to Meng Bo by unanimous decision, she would go on to win 11 straight fights before challenging Simone Duarte for the Kunlun Fight Female Strawweight Championship on May 25, 2017, at Kunlun Fight MMA 11. She won the fight via TKO in the second round.

Zhang made her first title defense against Aline Sattelmayer on June 1, 2017, at Kunlun Fight MMA 12. She won the fight by unanimous decision.

On July 22, 2017, Zhang attempted to win a second title, when she challenged Seo Ye-dam (서예담) for the vacant Top FC Strawweight Championship at TOP FC 15. She won the fight via TKO in the second round to capture the title.

In her next bout, Zhang made her second KLF title defense on August 28, 2017, at Kunlun Fight MMA 14 against Marilia Santos. She won the fight via TKO in the second round.

Zhang would fight one more time for KLF, amassing a record of 16-1 and improving her winning streak to 16 before signing with the UFC.

Ultimate Fighting Championship 
Zhang made her promotion debut on August 4, 2018, at UFC 227 against Danielle Taylor. She won the fight via unanimous decision.

On November 24, 2018, Zhang faced Jessica Aguilar at UFC Fight Night: Blaydes vs. Ngannou 2. She won the fight via a submission in round one.

Zhang faced Tecia Torres on March 3, 2019, at UFC 235. She won the fight via unanimous decision.

UFC Strawweight Champion 
Zhang faced Jéssica Andrade for the UFC Women's Strawweight Championship on August 31, 2019, at UFC Fight Night 157. She won the fight via first-round technical knockout to become the new strawweight champion. The win also earned Zhang her first Performance of the Night bonus award.

In the first defense of her title, Zhang faced former strawweight champion Joanna Jędrzejczyk on March 7, 2020, at UFC 248. Zhang moved her training camp from China to Thailand and later moved to Dubai due to the COVID-19 pandemic, as TSA rules stated a two-week quarantine was imposed for any non-US citizen be granted entry to the United States if they had recently been in China. After multiple failed attempts to obtain a US visa to fight in UFC's events in the US, on February 19, 2020, Zhang was granted US visa to fight at UFC 248. Zhang won the back–and–forth fight via split decision, which marked her first successful title defense. This win also marked her first Fight of the Night award. This bout was considered by many pundits as the greatest fight in women's MMA history.

In the second defense of her title, Zhang faced former strawweight champion Rose Namajunas on April 24, 2021, at UFC 261. She lost the fight by knockout early in the first round after getting caught with a head kick.

Post title reign and second title shot
A rematch between Zhang and Namajunas for the UFC Women's Strawweight Championship took place on November 6, 2021 at UFC 268. After a back and forth bout, Weili lost the fight via split decision. 14 out of 22 media scores gave it to Namajunas.

A rematch between Zhang and Joanna Jędrzejczyk took place on June 11, 2022 at UFC 275. For this fight Zhang trained at Bangtao Muay Thai & MMA gym in Thailand and worked with Josh Hinger. Zhang won the fight via knockout with a spinning backfist in the second round.  This win earned her the Performance of the Night award and the Crypto.com "Fan Bonus of the Night" awards paid in bitcoin of US$10,000 for third place.

Weili faced reigning champion Carla Esparza for the UFC Women's Strawweight Championship on November 12, 2022, at UFC 281. Zhang won the bout and regained the championship by the way of a rear-naked choke submission in the second round.  This win earned her the Performance of the Night award. Zhang was promoted to Brown Belt in Brazilian Jiu-Jitsu following her win.

Other ventures 
In May 2020, it was announced that Zhang became a brand ambassador for cosmetics brand Estée Lauder in China, and was chosen as a face of their new makeup line Double Wear. In the same year, she appeared in a commercial for Audi. In 2021, she was named a global ambassador for recovery technology company Hyperice. She also had endorsement deals with clothing brands Under Armour and Heilan Home, e-commerce company JingDong and alcoholic beverage company Wusu Beer.

Championships and accomplishments

Mixed martial arts 
 Ultimate Fighting Championship
 UFC Women's Strawweight Championship (Two times, Current)
 One successful title defense
First ever Chinese champion in UFC history
Fight of the Night (One time) 
 Performance of the Night (Three times) 
2020 UFC President's Choice Fight of the Year vs. Joanna Jędrzejczyk
 Kunlun Fight
 KLF Female Strawweight Champion (One time)
 Two successful title defenses
 Top Fighting Championship
 Top FC Strawweight Champion (One time)
 MMAJunkie.com
2020 March Fight of the Month vs. Joanna Jędrzejczyk
2020 Fight of the Year vs. Joanna Jędrzejczyk
2022 June Knockout of the Month vs. Joanna Jędrzejczyk
2022 November submission of the Month vs. Carla Esparza
2022 Female Fighter of the Year
2022 Comeback Fighter of the Year
 World MMA Awards
2019 – July 2020 Fight of the Year vs. Joanna Jędrzejczyk at UFC 248
Wrestling Observer Newsletter
2020 MMA Match of the Year vs. Joanna Jędrzejczyk
MMA Fighting
2020 Fight of the Year vs. Joanna Jędrzejczyk
The Athletic
2020 Fight of the Year vs. Joanna Jędrzejczyk
Bleacher Report
2020 Fight of the Year vs. Joanna Jędrzejczyk
Cageside Press
2020 Fight of the Year vs. Joanna Jędrzejczyk
2022 Female Fighter of the Year
Sherdog
2020 Fight of the Year vs. Joanna Jędrzejczyk
BT Sport
2020 Fight of the Year vs. Joanna Jędrzejczyk
2022 Female Fighter of the Year
MMA Weekly
2020 Fight of the Year vs. Joanna Jędrzejczyk
Combat Press
2020 Fight of the Year vs. Joanna Jędrzejczyk
ESPN
2022 Female Fighter of the Year

Mixed martial arts record 

|-
|Win
|align=center|23–3
|Carla Esparza
|Submission (rear-naked choke)
|UFC 281
| 
|align=center|2
|align=center|1:05
|New York City, New York, United States
|
|-
|Win
|align=center|22–3
|Joanna Jędrzejczyk
|KO (spinning backfist)
|UFC 275
|
|align=center|2
|align=center|2:28
|Kallang, Singapore
| 
|-
|Loss
|align=center|21–3
|Rose Namajunas
|Decision (split)
|UFC 268
|
|align=center|5
|align=center|5:00
|New York City, New York, United States
|
|-
|Loss
|align=center|21–2
|Rose Namajunas
|KO (head kick)
|UFC 261
|
|align=center|1
|align=center|1:18
|Jacksonville, Florida, United States
||
|- 
|Win
|align=center|21–1
|Joanna Jędrzejczyk
|Decision (split)
|UFC 248
|
|align=center|5
|align=center|5:00
|Las Vegas, Nevada, United States
|
|-
|Win
|align=center|20–1
|Jéssica Andrade
|TKO (knees and punches)
|UFC Fight Night: Andrade vs. Zhang
|
|align=center|1
|align=center|0:42
|Shenzhen, China
|
|-
| Win
| align=center| 19–1
| Tecia Torres
| Decision (unanimous)
| UFC 235
| 
| align=center| 3
| align=center| 5:00
| Las Vegas, Nevada, United States
|
|-
| Win
| align=center| 18–1
| Jessica Aguilar
| Submission (armbar)
| UFC Fight Night: Blaydes vs. Ngannou 2
| 
| align=center| 1
| align=center| 3:41
| Beijing, China
|
|-
| Win
| align=center| 17–1
| Danielle Taylor
| Decision (unanimous)
| UFC 227
| 
| align=center| 3
| align=center| 5:00
| Los Angeles, California, United States
|
|-
| Win
| align=center| 16–1
| Bianca Sattelmayer
| Submission (armbar)
| Kunlun Fight MMA 15
| 
| align=center| 1
| align=center| 3:29
| Seoul, South Korea
| 
|-
| Win
| align=center| 15–1
| Marilia Santos
| TKO (elbows)
| Kunlun Fight MMA 14
| 
| align=center| 2
| align=center| 3:20
| Yantai, China
| 
|-
| Win
| align=center| 14–1
| Ye Dam Seo
| TKO (elbow and punches)
| Top FC 15
| 
| align=center| 2
| align=center| 1:35
| Seoul, South Korea
| 
|-
| Win
| align=center| 13–1
| Aline Sattelmayer
| Decision (unanimous)
| Kunlun Fight MMA 12
| 
| align=center| 3
| align=center| 5:00
| Yantai, China
| 
|-
| Win
| align=center| 12–1
| Simone Duarte
| TKO (punches)
| Kunlun Fight MMA 11
| 
| align=center| 1
| align=center| 2:29
| Jining, China
| 
|-
| Win
| align=center| 11–1
| Nayara Hemily
| Submission (guillotine choke)
| Kunlun Fight MMA 9
| 
| align=center| 1
| align=center| 0:41
| Sanya, China
|
|-
| Win
| align=center| 10–1
| Veronica Grenno
| TKO (knees to the body)
| Kunlun Fight MMA 8
| 
| align=center| 1
| align=center| 1:50
| Sanya, China
|
|-
| Win
| align=center| 9–1
| Karla Benitez
| KO (punch)
| Kunlun Fight MMA 7
| 
| align=center| 1
| align=center| 2:15
| Beijing, China
|
|-
| Win
| align=center| 8–1
| Maíra Mazar
| Submission (rear-naked choke)
| Kunlun Fight 53
| 
| align=center| 1
| align=center| 4:11
| Beijing, China
|
|-
| Win
| align=center| 7–1
| Emi Fujino
| TKO (doctor stoppage)
| Kunlun Fight 49
| 
| align=center| 2
| align=center| 2:51
| Tokyo, Japan
|
|-
| Win
| align=center| 6–1
| Liliya Kazak
| KO (head kick)
| Kunlun Fight 47
| 
| align=center| 2
| align=center| 4:13
| Nanjing, China
|
|-
| Win
| align=center| 5–1
| Alice Ardelean
| Submission (rear-naked choke)
| Kunlun Fight MMA  5 / Top FC 11
| 
| align=center| 2
| align=center| 4:41
| Seoul, South Korea
|
|-
| Win
| align=center| 4–1
| Svetlana Gotsyk
| TKO (punches)
| Kunlun Fight 38 / Super Muaythai 2016
| 
| align=center| 2
| align=center| 2:29
| Pattaya, Thailand
|
|-
| Win
| align=center| 3–1
| Samantha Jean-Francois
| TKO (punches)
| Kunlun Fight 35
| 
| align=center| 1
| align=center| 3:37
| Luoyang, China
|
|-
| Win
| align=center| 2–1
| Mei Huang
| Submission (rear-naked choke)
| Chinese Kung Fu Championships
| 
| align=center| 1
| align=center| 0:40
| Qian'an, China
| 
|-
| Win
| align=center| 1–1
| Shuxia Wu
| Submission (armbar)
| Chinese Kung Fu Championships
| 
| align=center| 1
| align=center| 1:56
| Qian'an, China
| 
|-
| Loss
| align=center| 0–1
| Meng Bo
| Decision (unanimous)
| China MMA League
| 
| align=center| 2
| align=center| 5:00
| Xuchang, China
|
|-

Kickboxing record 

|- style="background:#fbb;"
| 2017-12-17|| Loss || style="text-align:left;"| Guan Acui|| Kunlun Fight 68 || Zunyi, China ||Decision || 3 || 3:00
|-
! colspan="8" style="background:white" |
|- style="background:#cfc;"
| 2017-12-17|| Win || style="text-align:left;"| Chang Ningning || Kunlun Fight 68 || Zunyi, China || Decision || 3 || 3:00
|-
! colspan="8" style="background:white" |
|- style="background:#cfc;"
| 2017-12-17|| Win || style="text-align:left;"| Alma Juniku || Kunlun Fight 68 || Zunyi, China || Decision || 3 || 3:00
|-
! colspan="8" style="background:white" |
|-  style="background:#fbb;"
| 2013-12-14|| Loss ||align=left| Sasaki ||  || Tokyo, Japan || Decision (Unanimous) || 3 || 3:00
|-
| colspan=9 | Legend:

See also 
 List of current UFC fighters
 List of female mixed martial artists

References

External links 
 
 

1989 births
Chinese female kickboxers
Chinese female mixed martial artists
Chinese practitioners of Brazilian jiu-jitsu
Female Brazilian jiu-jitsu practitioners
Chinese sanshou practitioners
Kunlun Fight kickboxers
Kunlun Fight MMA Fighters
Living people
Sportspeople from Handan
Strawweight mixed martial artists
Ultimate Fighting Championship champions
Ultimate Fighting Championship female fighters
Mixed martial artists utilizing sanshou
Mixed martial artists utilizing kickboxing
Mixed martial artists utilizing Shuai Jiao
Mixed martial artists utilizing Brazilian jiu-jitsu
Kunlun Fight MMA champions